Jared Francis Harris (born 24 August 1961) is a British actor. His roles include Lane Pryce in the AMC television drama series Mad Men, for which he was nominated for the Primetime Emmy Award for Outstanding Supporting Actor in a Drama Series; David Robert Jones in the science fiction series Fringe; King George VI in the historical drama series The Crown; Anderson Dawes on the science fiction series The Expanse; Captain Francis Crozier in the AMC series The Terror; and Valery Legasov in the HBO miniseries Chernobyl, for which he won the British Academy Television Award for Best Actor and was nominated for the 2019 Primetime Emmy Award for Outstanding Lead Actor in a Limited Series or Movie. He has also had significant supporting roles in films such as Mr. Deeds (2002), The Curious Case of Benjamin Button (2008), Sherlock Holmes: A Game of Shadows (2011), Lincoln (2012), and Allied (2016). In 2021, he took the role of Hari Seldon, a leading character in the Apple TV+ science fiction series Foundation.

Early life 

Harris was born on 24 August 1961 in Hammersmith, London, the second of three sons of Irish actor Richard Harris and his first wife, Welsh actress Elizabeth Rees-Williams. His younger brother is actor Jamie Harris, his older brother is director Damian Harris and his maternal grandfather was politician David Rees-Williams, 1st Baron Ogmore.

Education
Harris was educated at Ladycross School, a former preparatory boarding independent school in the coastal town of Seaford in East Sussex, as were his brothers Jamie and Damian. He says, "They were famous for discipline, with cold showers every morning", and that "You were never known by your first name there. You were either called by your number, or your last name. Since there were three of us, Damian was 'Harris Ma' for major. I was 'Harris Mi' for minor, and Jamie was 'Harris Minimus,' being the youngest and the smallest". He then attended Downside School, a Catholic boarding independent school in the village of Stratton-on-the-Fosse (near the market town of Shepton Mallet) in Somerset, in South West England. He went on to Duke University in the U.S., graduating in 1984 with an BFA in drama, then returned to England to train as an actor at the Central School of Speech and Drama, graduating in 1989.

Career 
Harris began his film career directing Darkmoor (1983), an unfinished feature-length film for Duke University's Freewater Films. His first film appearance as an actor was in The Rachel Papers (1989). He portrayed the role of the aged Will Robinson in the movie adaptation of the television series Lost in Space. Harris portrayed Dr. Charles Ashford in Resident Evil: Apocalypse, Benmont Tench in Jim Jarmusch's Dead Man, and Kenneth Branagh's character's doppelgänger in How to Kill Your Neighbor's Dog.

Other notable roles include King Henry VIII in the 2003 film adaptation of the novel The Other Boleyn Girl. He also portrayed Andy Warhol in I Shot Andy Warhol and John Lennon in the television movie Two of Us (2000).  He portrayed Vladimir in the black comedy drama film Happiness (1998), written and directed by Todd Solondz. He portrayed the gruff Captain Anderson in the BBC2 adaptation of To the Ends of the Earth; Mac McGrath in the movie Mr. Deeds; Eamon Quinn on the FX series The Riches; and David Robert Jones on Fringe. One of his more recent film roles was Ulysses S. Grant in the Steven Spielberg-directed Lincoln. He portrayed Lane Pryce in Mad Men from 2009 until 2012 and returned to the series to direct the 11th episode of season 7, which aired in 2015.

His portrayal of King George VI in the first season of The Crown received praise from critic Matt Zoller Seitz, who stated that despite the series' large ensemble, "Harris still manages to communicate the character’s understated sensitivity and awareness of his circumscribed role in England’s drama so poignantly that one can’t help being moved by the performance".

He portrayed Captain Francis Crozier in the 2018 series The Terror, based on the Dan Simmons novel of the same name that provided a fictional account of the fate of Franklin's lost expedition. In November 2018, Harris was one of the first recipients of the Royal Canadian Geographical Society's Louie Kamookak Medal, awarded "for making Canada's geography better known to Canadians and to the world", for his portrayal of Captain Crozier. Harris said that he was "gratified" that the series inspired curiosity about the real expedition, remarking, "It’s sort of fitting that history will recall that it was the RCGS that first recognized The Terror, and that we as the recipients walked in the footsteps of Louie Kamookak."

In 2019, Harris portrayed Valery Legasov in the acclaimed miniseries Chernobyl, which revolves around the Chernobyl disaster of 1986 and the cleanup efforts that followed. For that role he won the British Academy Television Award for Best Actor and was nominated for the Primetime Emmy Award for Outstanding Lead Actor in a Limited Series or Movie and Golden Globe Award for Best Actor – Miniseries or Television Film. The series was produced by HBO in the United States and Sky UK in the United Kingdom.

In March 2019, Harris joined Jared Leto in Sony's Spider-Man spinoff Morbius. He plays the developer of psychohistory Hari Seldon in the Foundation television series produced for Apple TV+ which premiered in September 2021. In March 2021, Harris was announced to have joined the cast of the biographical drama film Rothko, directed by Sam Taylor-Johnson.

Personal life
Harris married Jacqueline Goldenberg in 1989 and they divorced three years later. On 16 July 2005, Harris married actress Emilia Fox, the daughter of actors Edward Fox and Joanna David, and filed for divorce in January 2009; the divorce was finalised in June 2010.

In April 2009, Harris met Allegra Riggio, a lighting designer and television host, at a comedy club where a mutual friend was performing. They married on 9 November 2013. Harris resides in Los Angeles.

Filmography

Awards and nominations

Honors 
On 18 October 2019 Harris received the Cinema Vanguard award at the San Diego International Film Festival. Previous winners include Topher Grace, Kate Beckinsale and Adrien Brody.

References

External links

 
 

1961 births
Living people
20th-century English male actors
21st-century English male actors
Alumni of the Royal Central School of Speech and Drama
Audiobook narrators
Best Actor BAFTA Award (television) winners
British expatriate male actors in the United States
Duke University alumni
English expatriates in the United States
English male film actors
English male television actors
English male voice actors
English people of Irish descent
English people of Welsh descent
Male actors from London
People educated at Downside School
People from Hammersmith
Robin Fox family